The 1945–46 FA Cup was the 65th season of the world's oldest football cup competition, the Football Association Challenge Cup, generally known as the FA Cup, and the first to be held after the Second World War. Derby County were the winners, beating Charlton Athletic 4–1 after extra time in the final at Wembley, London. The tournament witnessed a disaster in the sixth round when, during the second leg of the Bolton–Stoke City tie, 33 people were crushed to death in the Burnden Park disaster.

For the only time in the history of the competition, all matches from the First Round Proper up to and including the Sixth Round Proper were played over two legs, the first leg being played at the stadium of the team named first on the date specified for each round, which was always a Saturday. In the first and second rounds proper, the second leg was played on the following Saturday; from the third round onwards, it was played during the week following the first leg. If aggregate scores were level after 90 minutes of the second leg had been played, a replay would take place at a neutral venue.  These changes were made in order to give clubs additional revenue, as the Football League would not resume normal play until the autumn of 1946.

Calendar 

w/c = week commencing

Results

First round proper

At this stage 38 Third Division North and Third Division South clubs joined the 25 non-league clubs who came through the qualifying rounds. Instead, Chester, Cardiff City, Crystal Palace and Norwich City entered in third round. Hull City, and New Brighton not enter to compete this season. To complete this stage, Newport County from Second Division entered in this round plus non-league teams Bath City, Yeovil Town, Bishop Auckland and South Liverpool, 

The first leg matches were played on Saturday, 17 November 1945 and the second legs on the following Saturday, 24 November 1945. No replays were necessary.

Second round proper
The first leg matches were played on Saturday, 8 December 1945 and the second legs on the following Saturday, 15 December 1945. No replays were necessary.

Third round proper
At this stage the remaining First and Second Division (except Newport County that entered in the first round) clubs entered the competition plus Third Division clubs Chester, Cardiff City, Crystal Palace and Norwich City.

The first leg matches were played on Saturday, 5 January 1946 and the second legs in the following week commencing Monday, 7 January 1946. Two replays were necessary, both of which were played on Wednesday, 16 January 1946.

Fourth round proper
The first leg matches were played on Saturday, 26 January 1946 and the second legs in the following week commencing Monday, 28 January 1946. One replay was necessary, which was played on 4 February 1946.

Fifth Round Proper
The first leg matches were played on Saturday, 9 February 1946 and the second legs in the following week commencing Monday, 11 February 1946.

Sixth Round Proper

Semi-finals

Replay

Final

The final took place on Saturday, 27 April 1946 at Wembley and ended in a 4–1 win for Derby County after extra time. Charlton Athletic's Bert Turner opened the scoring with an own goal in the 85th minute, which he equalised a minute later to force extra time. A goal from Peter Doherty and two from Jack Stamps completed Derby's victory.

Notes

External links
The FA Cup Archive at TheFA.com
Results on Soccerbase

 
FA Cup seasons
Fa Cup, 1945-46
1945–46 domestic association football cups